Larry Reisbig (c.1940 – April 10, 2017) was a former American football player and coach. He served as the head football coach at California State University, Long Beach (Long Beach State) from 1987 to 1989, compiling a record of 11–24.

Reisbig was a native of Los Angeles. He played high school football at Van Nuys High School in the late 1950s and college football at Washington State University from 1961 to 1962. Reisig began his coaching career at the high school level in Sandy, Oregon. After two years he returned to Southern California to coach at William S. Hart High School and Canyon High School in Santa Clarita.

In 1970, he joined the football coaching staff at the College of the Canyons for the program's inaugural season. He was promoted to head coach in 1973 and compiled a record of 51–38 over nine seasons before the program folded in 1981. Reisebig then worked as the head football coach at Pasadena City College for three years. He joined the Long Beach State 49ers football program in 1985 as an assistant under Mike Sheppard, who he succeeded after two seasons.

Reisebig later coached at Orange Coast College and Long Beach City College before retiring in 2002. He died on April 10, 2017 at the age of 77.

Head coaching record

College

References

1940s births
2017 deaths
Long Beach State 49ers football coaches
Washington State Cougars football players
High school football coaches in California
Pasadena City Lancers football coaches
People from Van Nuys, Los Angeles
Sportspeople from Santa Clarita, California
Players of American football from Los Angeles
Sports coaches from Los Angeles